The Capital District Transportation Authority (CDTA) is a New York State public-benefit corporation overseeing a number of multi-modal parts of public transportation in the Capital District of New York State (Albany, Schenectady, Rensselaer and  Saratoga counties). CDTA runs local and express buses, including three lines of an express bus service called BusPlus (one between Albany and Schenectady and one between Albany and Troy), and day-to-day management of three Amtrak stations in the Capital region–the Albany-Rensselaer, Schenectady and Saratoga Springs Amtrak stations.

Created as an act of the New York State Legislature in August 1970, CDTA was formed similarly to agencies in Syracuse, Rochester, and Buffalo.  In 1970, CDTA purchased and took over management of the United Traction Company and Schenectady Transit.

CDTA bus operators, dispatchers, and supervisory staff are organized in Local 1321 of the Amalgamated Transit Union (ATU).

Governance 

CDTA is overseen by a nine-member board of directors.

At the present time, the board representation includes:

 Three members representing Albany County
 Two members representing Rensselaer County
 One member representing Schenectady County
 Two members representing Saratoga County
 One member (non-voting) representing the labor unions

There is also an executive director that handles day-to-day business, reporting to the board of directors. In 2017, the CDTA had operating expenses of $108.41 million and a level of staffing of 821 people.

Fixed route services 

CDTA operates 56 routes, many of which connect neighborhoods to downtowns or downtowns to shopping areas; with six routes linking key towns together. Two routes, 11-UAlbany Shuttle and 286-RPI Shuttle, are shuttle services for area universities which are also open to the public. Service mostly runs from 5:30 a.m.-12:00 a.m. weeknights, 6:00 a.m.-12:00 a.m. Saturdays, and 7:00 a.m.-10:00 p.m. Sundays with the college routes running until 2:00 a.m. in Albany and Troy (with several RPI-only runs running until 4:00 a.m.).

Albany Division 

Before CDTA, many of these routes belonged to the Albany-Nassau Bus Company (Routes 32/33) and United Traction. Buses run from Capital Depot next to CDTA's headquarters on 110 Watervliet Avenue in Albany.

In early 2011, CDTA announced its plans to restructure the Albany County bus routes in two phases. Phase 1 involved reconstructing routes within the city of Albany, with a public input campaign held until August 2011. The results were five new neighborhood routes and three commuter routes. Its goal was to have a more uniformed bus system without any route deviation. Phase 1 of the reconstructing went into effect on November 13, 2011. In August 2012, CDTA revealed the draft plan for Phase 2 of the reconstructing. Phase 2 involved reconstructing routes within the western and northern portions of Albany County, with a public input campaign held until September 2012. Phase 2 of the reconstructing went into effect on November 11, 2012.

Schenectady Division 

Saratoga Services

The City of Saratoga Springs service also operates from Schenectady Division.  These routes run seven days a week. Before July 2007, the Saratoga Springs buses were operated from the Uncle Sam Depot at 40 Hoosick Street in Troy, with limited service. There was no direct connection to the Albany/Schenectady/Troy routes. Route #50 was operated from the Electric Depot at 2401 Maxon Road Ext. in Schenectady, and only provided one AM and one PM weekday trip between Schenectady and Ballston Spa. On July 2, 2007, the initial Saratoga Springs Route Expansion went into effect, with the implementation of a new three-digit route identification system. Route #50 was extended to provide hourly service, seven days a week; on NY 50 between Schenectady and Wilton Mall, with deviations along Rowland St and Geyser Rd in Milton as well as deviations along Excelsior Ave in Saratoga Springs. All of the Saratoga Springs buses began operating from the Schenectady Garage on Maxon Rd. Ext. On May 28, 2016, the Saratoga Springs restructure plan went into effect. Route #50 was renumbered Route #450 and rerouted to run along NY 50 from Schenectady to Wilton Mall with no deviations. New Routes #451 and #452 include former Route #50 deviations, as well as portions of old Routes #472 and #473. CDTA plans to eventually construct a Saratoga Springs bus garage at Grande Industrial Park, off of Geyser Rd.

Troy Division

Other services

Shuttles 
CDTA formerly ran three suburban shuttles, all operated by Albany Division, that used smaller cutaway vans, with the purpose of serving offices and major points of interest not on main CDTA routes, nor needing full sized buses. In November 2012, all Shuttle services were discontinued and replaced with fixed-route service during Phase 2 of the Albany County reconstructing. Two new bus routes (#117 and #155) were created.  Route #117 operates between British-American Blvd, Albany International Airport, Wolf Rd, Colonie Center, Crossgates Mall and Twenty Mall. Route #155 operates between Albany International Airport, ITT Tech, NY 155, Washington Ave Ext., Walmart, and Crossgates Mall.

BusPlus 

The 2005 plan included the development of bus rapid transit on the Route 5 corridor, between Downtown Albany and Downtown Schenectady, supplementing Route #55 (which handled 20% of CDTA's ridership).  This plan also led to modifications on Routes #1 and #2.  Queue jumping and signal priority were planned to make BRT more attractive to the region, after light rail was rejected.  As of mid-2007, this part of the 2005 plan was placed on hold.

In early 2008, CDTA announced that it was going forward with the bus rapid transit line on NY 5, which included 19 upgraded stations. NY 5 BRT service began on Monday, April 4, 2011, with new silver and red-branded Gillig 40-foot hybrid buses, numbered Route #905 and referred to as BusPlus. When NY 5 BusPlus service began, Route #55 was renumbered Route #355 and shortened to provide Rt. 5 local service, between Downtown Schenectady and Colonie Center.  Route #1 continues to provide Rt. 5 local service between Downtown Albany and Colonie Center. Route #55x (the Schenectady/Albany Express buses) was replaced with Routes #530, #531 and #532 (Route #532 was merged with Route #531 on November 13, 2011). Route #2 was replaced with Routes #125 and #138 during Phase 1 of the Albany County Route Restructuring in November 2011. BusPlus service runs the entire length of the Route 5 corridor, although it currently operates differently from the original plans.  In the short term, transit signal priority and queue jump lanes are being constructed and will be rolled out as features of the bus rapid transit service.  Although it is called bus rapid transit, Route #905 is more of an enhanced limited-stop service than an actual BRT service, with only 19 stops between Downtown Schenectady and Downtown Albany.  Improvements and expansions to BusPlus are still in planning, with proposed lines along the Washington Ave./Western Ave. corridor in Albany and along the NY 32/Broadway corridor between Downtown Albany, Menands and Troy/Cohoes. In November 2020, the BRT BusPlus Service was expanded from one to three routes with #905 being referred to as the "Red Line" and the two new routes that operate along the NY 32/Broadway corridor between Downtown Albany, Menands, and Troy/Cohoes, #922 & #923, as the "Blue Line". The proposed line along the Washington Ave./Western Ave. corridor is being referred to as the "Purple Line".

Saratoga "Trolley" 
In cooperation with the Saratoga Chamber of Commerce, CDTA operates open-air trolleys during the summer months. In the past, the trolleys would run from Memorial Day weekend to Labor Day to serve popular destinations such as the Saratoga Performing Arts Center, Saratoga Spa State Park, the Saratoga Casino and Raceway, the Saratoga Race Course and Broadway. Prior to 2011, the trolley ran between Skidmore College and the Saratoga Performing Arts Center. From 2007 to 2010, Route #471 provided summer service to the Saratoga Race Course, before it was discontinued due to low ridership. From 2011 to 2015, the trolley route ran between Broadway, the Saratoga Performing Arts Center, Saratoga Spa State Park, the Saratoga Casino and Raceway and the Saratoga Race Course, to include areas previously served by Route #471. , trolley service to Skidmore College was discontinued, with year-round service to Skidmore College continued on former Route #473 and new Route #452. , trolley service to Saratoga Spa State Park and the Saratoga Performing Arts Center has been discontinued and replaced by a new route that runs between the Courtyard Hotel, Broadway, the Saratoga Race Course and the Saratoga Casino and Raceway. The 2016 changes also included free fare for all riders and service reduction to instead only run from Independence Day weekend to Labor Day. While not marked as such on the vehicles, this service appears as Route #875 on the Saratoga Service map.

STAR Service 
In 1982, CDTA began providing paratransit services to riders who are medically unable to take regular transit services. ADA wheelchair-accessible buses were added in 1988; since 2004, all CDTA routes have been wheelchair-accessible.  The Star fleet has had a variety of minibuses.  Though for most of its history it has been dominated by the Orion II low-floor minibus, STAR has begun replacing older models with Startrans "Senator" cutaway vehicles. Other minibuses in the fleet include Ford "ELF" minibuses and several transfers from suburban shuttle routes (see below).

NX: Northway Xpress 

The NX: Northway Xpress is a group of express routes that links Albany to towns in Saratoga County which is operated under contract by Upstate Transit (which had been contracted to run the service since 2006). These routes run from Saratoga Springs, Ballston Spa, Malta, Clifton Park, Round Lake, and South Glens Falls to Downtown Albany. In October 2012, Northway Express fares and schedules were redesigned to increase ridership and service efficiency. Fare structure was consolidated from 5 zones to 3 zones, with the addition of an unlimited ride prepayment card. Service was also eliminated from areas with low ridership, including Mechanicville, Stillwater, Albany International Airport, SUNY Albany, Wolf Road and the Harriman State Office Campus. In May 2014, Northway Express service was expanded to Corporate Woods.

Rural service 
Until 2012, CDTA operated rural/lifeline services to several areas in rural Albany and Rensselaer counties, once per week, including routes #810 (Berne/Knox), #812 (Rensselaerville), #870 (Saratoga County Shuttle), and #96 (Rensselaer Rural, with summer Grafton State Park service); as part of CDTA's route restructuring, these routes are being phased out.

Flex Service 
In 2020, CDTA began a service called Flex which is an On-Demand service where you request a ride to go where you want and a van picks you up and transports you to you desired location or CDTA bus route. Riders will use an app similar to Uber and Lyft to request their ride. Currently the service only operates in parts of Colonie & Guilderland but there hopes to potentially expand the program in the future. At first the service was free, but in October 2020, CDTA started requiring riders to pay for each ride of Flex they took. In September 2021, the service was expanded to the Southern part of Saratoga County, New York to service Clifton Park, Halfmoon & Mechanicville.

Electric scooters 
The CDTA has been promoting the use of its own electric scooters for use. Initially planned for use by the public in the summer of 2021, implementation has been delayed.

Fleet

Active fleet 
All buses are wheelchair accessible.

Future fleet 
The Gillig buses are part of a five-year contract between CDTA and Gillig awarded in April 2006, 2011 & 2016 that replaced most of the 1998 Orion VI fleet.  In December 2014, CDTA also awarded a contract with New Flyer for 20 articulated buses to be delivered over a five-year period.

Transit development plan 
In 2005, CDTA commissioned a transit development plan that would create a planned environment to react to needed changes in the CDTA organization.

Parts of this plan have included:
  Replacing similar numbers of transit vehicles each year over an expected twelve-year life span, creating a more uniform expectation of vehicles needing replacement, also replacing few and larger orders.  This began in 2007, and is expected to reduce the costs of maintaining an aging fleet.
  Replacing Orion VI buses by 2012 and the NABI and NovaBus LFS buses by 2016.
  Installing LED destination signs on all vehicles, replacing expensive curtain style signage.
  Expansion of service in Saratoga Springs, which took place in July 2007 and modified in May 2016. In addition a further expansion is planned, and includes erecting and opening of a bus garage in Saratoga Springs for Saratoga County vehicles.
  Redrawing bus routes in hopes to better serve riders, starting with Schenectady-based routes in the second half of 2007.
  Implementation of a three-digit route system, in which the first digit will serve as an indication of the route's primary base. As part of the new three-digit system, 100 routes represent Albany Division, 200 routes represent Troy Division, 300 routes represent Schenectady Division, 400 routes represent Saratoga service, 500 routes represent express route service, 600 routes represent shuttle service, 700 routes represent commuter service, 800 routes represent rural service and 900 routes represent Bus Rapid Transit service.
  Expansion of service into Montgomery County to service the City of Amsterdam.

See also 
 Albany Convention Center Authority
 Albany Port District Commission
 Nelson A. Rockefeller Empire State Plaza Performing Arts Center Corporation
 Capital District
 New York State Archives
 Central New York Regional Transportation Authority – Syracuse, New York
 Metropolitan Transportation Authority – New York Metropolitan Area
 Niagara Frontier Transportation Authority – Buffalo, New York
 Rochester-Genesee Regional Transportation Authority – Rochester, New York

References

External links 

Bus transportation in New York (state)
Transportation Authority
Public benefit corporations in New York (state)
Government agencies established in 1970
Transportation in Capital District (New York)
Public utilities of the United States
Paratransit services in the United States
Companies based in Albany, New York
1970 establishments in New York (state)